Michael Seater (born January 15, 1987) is a Canadian actor, director, screenwriter, and producer. His most notable roles are Spencer Sharpe in The Zack Files, Lucas Randall in Strange Days at Blake Holsey High, Tom Bellow in 18 to Life, and Derek Venturi in Life with Derek. He later portrayed James Gillies in Murdoch Mysteries, from 2009 to 2017.

Aside from acting, Seater has ventured into filmmaking, with the independent feature films People Hold On (2015) and Sadie's Last Days on Earth (2016), which he wrote, directed, and co-produced.

Early life
Seater was born and raised in Toronto, Ontario. He attended the Etobicoke School of the Arts and worked as a child actor.

Career

Early work 
Seater began acting in the late 1990s and appeared in the short films, direct-to-video films, made-for-television films, several television series.

Seater voiced the title character in the series Mattimeo: A Tale of Redwall, which aired in 2000, starred as Lucas Randall in the television series Strange Days at Blake Holsey High, which began airing in 2002 and ended in 2006, and had a role in the 2005 film The Prize Winner of Defiance, Ohio, which starred Julianne Moore. Seater then appeared in the recurring role of Owen on the series ReGenesis, which ended after its fourth season.

2005–2014: Life with Derek and further acting work 
Seater garnered wider public recognition for his role as Derek Venturi on the popular Canadian family sitcom, Life with Derek, which was a hit with teens at the time. Seater starred on the series from its premiere in 2005 to its finale in 2009, for a total of 70 episodes and four seasons. Before the show's cancellation, Seater had written a script for an episode of the fourth season with his brother, Graham.

In 2009, following the conclusion of Life with Derek, Seater played a character in the Degrassi movie Degrassi Goes Hollywood and in 2010 he starred in the CBC series 18 to Life. He also played the recurring role of murderer and criminal mastermind James Gillies in the Canadian series Murdoch Mysteries.

From 2012 to 2013, Seater also had a recurring role on the Canadian television series Bomb Girls. He also appeared in Bomb Girls: Facing the Enemy, a television film based on the series.

2015–present: Transition into filmmaking 
In 2015, Seater wrote and directed the feature film People Hold On, which was nominated for a Canadian Screen Award for Best Original Song (by Noah Reid). The film premiered at the Cinefest Sudbury International Film Festival in 2015. It received mixed reviews from critics.

In 2016, Seater wrote and directed his second feature film, Sadie's Last Days on Earth, which was produced by Shaftesbury Films. It was released on December 9, 2016 in theatres. It received mostly negative reviews from critics, and scored a 40% on Rotten Tomatoes.

Personal life 
Seater identifies as queer, and had input into the creation of his character James, a gay man, on The Wedding Planners. He is close friends with his Life with Derek co-star Ashley Leggat.

Filmography

Film

Television

References

External links

1987 births
Living people
21st-century Canadian male actors
Canadian male child actors
Canadian male film actors
Canadian male television actors
Canadian male voice actors
Canadian LGBT actors
LGBT male actors
Male actors from Toronto
Queer actors
21st-century Canadian LGBT people